The St Helens R.F.C. Academy has produced some of the finest youngsters, potential stars and internationals the world of rugby league has seen. Although initially, players were signed either from other clubs, or would go straight into first team reckoning after being signed from their amateur club at a much later age than today's system; as the game became more widespread in the town, across the North West and nationally, a system had to be introduced in order to suffice the amount of youth talent that the club homed.

History

More early examples of players that made the grade following on form their stints in the academy and reserves (previously known as the "St Helens Colts") include Steve Prescott, Paul Forber, Gary Connolly, and Chris Arkwright. St Helens traditional policy with youth was to make them better players for the club. If they did not make the grade immediately, they would either be loaned out or demoted from the first team to the "A" team squad. At the end of Super League XIV, the "Reserve Team Championship" was replaced with the Under 20s Championship, in a way to develop youth products of clubs. Now, however, it can be argued that Saints look to make them internationals, with no less than five of the current St Helens squad's youth products having gone on to represent either Great Britain or England or both. St Helens youth policy does not operate solely in the borough boundaries of the town. Indeed, many of St Helens current and past squads call areas like Widnes, Wigan, Cumbria and Oldham home. St Helens have, also, branched even into rugby union territory and other wider national areas for youth players; most recently, Daniel Brotherton, a winger from Northampton, signed a professional contract with the club, and has made great strides in the under 18s after his signing from Northampton Demons. The club now operate their youth programme out of Cowley Language College's sports facilities, and the clubs system now incorporates a more liberal system, not totally governed by age. Three over twenties can appear for the reserves or Under 20s, and some of the better players of the Under 18s may make a quick transition to the Under 20s if they are good enough. Similarly, some of the first team or Under 20s squad, either those fast tracked too soon, or returning from injury, or simply out of form may be demoted to the Under 20s or Under 18s in order to regain form and playing experience. As well as having Under 18s and 20s sides, St Helens also have two Under 16s sides; a permanent squad made of players on part-time contracts, as well as a service area side based on local amateur players. There is also a service area Under 18s team.

2011 squads

2011 Under 20s squad

2011 Under 18s squad

2011 Fixtures and Results

Under 20s

Salford City Reds 32–12 St Helens

St Helens 30–14 Harlequins RL

Under 18s

Biannual tour of Australia
Every two years, both the Under 18s and 20s sides embark on a month-long tour of Australia, to play against some of the NRL's youth sides. Their first and most previous tour was in 2009.

2009 tour
They defeated Balmain by 36–6 in their first fixture of the tour.
In their second game against West Tigers Cubs Elite Under 18s, they were again victorious in a margin of 18-to-6.
They lost their third game to Cronulla Sharks by 34–20.
They won their final game by 16–10 against a Penrith Panthers academy side.
 2011 October tour

References

Rugby clubs established in 1873
St Helens R.F.C.
Sports academies